Raymond Alcide Joseph (born August 31, 1931) is a Haitian diplomat, journalist, political activist and author. He was the Haitian ambassador to the United States from 2005 to 2010, and he resigned to be considered for candidacy in the 2010 Haitian presidential election. He is founder of the largest Haitian newspaper Haïti Observateur, based out of Brooklyn, New York, that circulates not only for the Haitian diaspora but in Haiti as well. He infamously ran an informant operation of sources surrounding, in, and out of the presidential palace in Haiti during the Duvalier authoritarian years, that leaked information for him to report, all while avoiding an attempt on his life.

Early life and education 
Joseph was born on August 31, 1931, in San Pedro de Macorís, Dominican Republic and lived in a batey (a sugar worker's town), whose family was originally from Les Cayes, Haiti. He is also a second cousin to the singer and rapper Wyclef Jean from his mother's side.

Raymond Joseph spent his early years surrounded by Christian missionaries. At birth, Joseph was refused Dominican citizenship in several attempts. Following the genocide of over 10,000 Haitians at the border due to the Parsley Massacre imposed by dictator Rafael Trujillo, his father moved him and his brother back to Haiti, where Haitian citizenship was acquired. By age 10, in addition to Spanish, he was fluent in his native Haitian Creole, French, and English. 

In 1954, he volunteered as an interpreter for a Baptist preacher, who assisted Joseph in coming to the United States. Joseph enrolled in the Moody Bible Institute in Chicago, Illinois, in 1954. Joseph remained in Chicago and later earned a BA in Anthropology from nearby Wheaton College.

During his time in Chicago, Joseph became fluent in Hebrew and Greek. A devout Christian, after graduation he returned to Haiti and created the first translation of the New Testament and Psalms into Haitian Creole.

In 1957, the dictator François "Papa Doc" Duvalier was elected President of Haiti, and Joseph became increasingly uncomfortable with the government. Joseph returned to the United States in 1961 and enrolled in the University of Chicago where he earned an MA in Social Anthropology in 1964.

Career 
Joseph subsequently moved to New York and became a leader in the opposition movement against the Duvalier regime. Along with his brother, Joseph founded the Haïti Observateur in 1971, which became influential and widely circulated among the Haitian diaspora. Joseph subsequently worked as a reporter at the Wall Street Journal and a columnist at the New York Sun.

Joseph turned his attention to the ongoing authoritative Duvalier regime in Haiti and built a network of informants inside the presidential palace of Port-au-Prince. He then would broadcast his intel from Brooklyn and in shortwaves in Haiti that became known Radio Vonvon, in which anti-communist associates from California and Ronald Reagan played a role in its formation. In an attempt to uncover the leaks inside of the palace, François Duvalier murdered 19 members of its guard and sent an assassin to New York to dispose of Joseph. However during a flight to New York, one of Joseph's sources was on the same plane and managed to tip him off. Expecting the assassin's arrival, he made a phone call to the would-be assassin, proposed a meeting and ended up having coffee together subsequentially avoiding assassination.

When the regime of François Duvalier's son finally collapsed in 1986. In 1990, Joseph was appointed the Haitian Government's chargé d’affaires in Washington, DC, and the representative of the Haitian Government to the Organization of American States. In this role, Joseph organized election observers from the international community to participate in the Haitian Presidential Election.

In 1991 Joseph returned to the Haïti Observateur where he remained until 2004, when he was again appointed Chargé d'Affaires in Washington, DC. In 2005 acting president Boniface Alexandre chose Joseph to be Haiti's ambassador to the United States. In the aftermath of the catastrophic January 12, 2010 earthquake in Haiti, Joseph played an active role in mobilizing the international community's response to Haiti.

Joseph authored a book, For Whom the Dogs Spy, detailing the Duvalier regime right up until the 2010 Haiti earthquake.

Presidential candidate 
On July 27, 2010, Joseph confirmed his intention to run for President of Haiti in the November 28, 2010 election.  He resigned the ambassadorship on August 1, 2010 and moved to Port-au-Prince. Joseph was dismissed from the Haitian presidential race by Haiti's Provisional Electoral Council.

References

External links

1931 births
Living people
Ambassadors of Haiti to the United States
Candidates for President of Haiti
Haitian Christians
Haitian political journalists
Haitian diplomats
Haitian writers
Permanent Representatives of Haiti to the Organization of American States
University of Chicago alumni
Wheaton College (Illinois) alumni